

Romualdius scaber, known generally as the crusted root weevil or crusted grass weevil, is a species of broad-nosed weevil in the beetle family Curculionidae. It is found in Europe and North America.

Nomenclature
The species was first described, as Curculio scaber, by Carl Linnaeus in 1758. Linnaeus' description was sketchy, and for a long time was thought to refer to the species now known as Otiorhynchus carinatopunctatus, with the present species referred to bifoveolatus Beck. This misunderstanding was corrected by Löbl & Smetana (2013).

While it was known as bifoveolatus, the species was designated by Roman Borovec (2009) as the type of his new genus Romualdius.

References

Further reading

External links

 

Entiminae
Articles created by Qbugbot
Beetles described in 1758